Gerald Quennet (born 11 December 1973) is a former footballer who is last known to have played as a striker for Wollongong Wolves. Born in France, he was a Tahiti international.

Career

Club career

Before the second half of 1998–99, he signed for Australian top flight side Wollongong Wolves.

International career

On 30 September 1998,  Quennet scored 3 goals for Tahiti during a 5–1 win over Vanuatu.

References

External links
 

French footballers
Expatriate soccer players in Australia
Living people
French Polynesian footballers
Tahiti international footballers
Wollongong Wolves FC players
Association football forwards
French expatriate sportspeople in Australia
French Polynesian expatriate footballers
1973 births
French expatriate footballers
1998 OFC Nations Cup players